T. P. M. Mohideen Khan (born in Tirunelveli on 19 July 1947) is the former minister for environment in the Tamil Nadu state of India. He was the member of Tamil Nadu Legislative Assembly, representing the Palayamkottai state assembly constituency, and was elected four times in the same constituency, sitting  from 2001 to 2021. His political party is the Dravida Munnetra Kazhagam party.

Career 
Khan begin his career as a businessman. He was very much inspired by Dravidian movement run by C. N. Annadurai and M. Karunanidhi, founder and leader of Dravida Munnetra Kazhagam, which was conducted all over Tamil Nadu to oppose Hindi as an official language there. He join Dravida Munnetra Kazhagam as volunteer and was involved in many train and bus strike in those days.

When Dravida Munnetra Kazhagam came to power, Khan was given many positions and, in 2001, he was the Palayamkottai candidate. He was  elected to the Tamil Nadu legislative assembly and still holds the position. In 2006, Dravida Munnetra Kazhagam won the election and he was made minister for environment.

Skills 
While minister, communicating with the finance minister, he implemented the computerisation of the vTamil Nadu Pollution Control Board within one month. The system speeded up the process of issuing permissions to investors and benefits the entire state.

Controversy 
In 2010, he left a police officer who was attacked by gangsters to die on the road without providing immediate help even though he had aconvoy of cars with him. Along with the minister for health, M. R. K. Panneerselvam, he did not get out of their car for 20 minutes and stood there as a mere witness to this incident.

References

External links 
 http://www.assembly.tn.gov.in/archive/13thassembly/disp_ind.asp?prof_id=269
 http://www.topnews.in/people/mohideen-khan

Dravida Munnetra Kazhagam politicians
Tamil Nadu ministers
Indian Muslims
Living people
1947 births
Tamil Nadu MLAs 2006–2011
Tamil Nadu MLAs 2011–2016
Tamil Nadu MLAs 2016–2021